Annenieki Parish is an administrative unit of Dobele Municipality, Latvia.

Towns, villages and settlements of Annenieki Parish 
Annenieki
Kaķenieki
Bērzupe
Ļukas
Slagūne
Ausātas

References 

Dobele Municipality
Parishes of Latvia